José Enrique Madrid (born April 21, 1988) is an Ecuadorian footballer currently playing for Guayaquil City.

Club career
He played for El Nacional in his youth. He scored 2 goals in 8 games for them and was a good talent for the team. He was a key player in Jorge Célico's strategic plan for the team.

Transfer
In October 2008, he and Jefferson Montero transferred to Mexican club Dorados de Sinaloa with a help from former Ecuadorian teammate, Christian Benítez. He debuted for Dorados on October 11 coming on as a substitute against Irapuato.
In January 2013, Madrid was transferred to LDU Quito.

References

External links

http://www.mundodeportivo.com.ec/newsv2.php?id_noticia=22854

1988 births
Living people
Sportspeople from Guayaquil
Association football fullbacks
Ecuadorian footballers
Ecuador international footballers
C.D. El Nacional footballers
C.D. Técnico Universitario footballers
Dorados de Sinaloa footballers
L.D.U. Quito footballers
Delfín S.C. footballers
Ecuadorian expatriate footballers
Expatriate footballers in Mexico